Dexterville is an unincorporated community in the town of Dexter, Wood County, Wisconsin, United States. It is located at the intersection of Wisconsin Highway 80 and Wisconsin Highway 54.

History
Dexterville was founded in about 1848. In 1850, the sawmilling magnate George Hiles moved to the area and set up a lumbermill in Dexterville. Dexter township may be named after Dexter, Michigan, the native home of a first settler, although folk etymology maintains the township is named after the mule of a local pioneer. Hiles was granted a post office for Dexterville in 1858. He created the Milwaukee, Dexterville, and Northern Railroad in 1887 to carry timber from the area. The railroad was purchased by the Chicago, Milwaukee, St. Paul and Pacific Railroad a few years later, and passed through the community in 1890.

The Dexterville Dam is located on the southern edge of Lake Dexter; it dams the Yellow River, creating Dexter Lake. The dam was created by Wood County to provide waterfront for the current Dexter County Park. A county worker died performing maintenance on the dam in 2009.

Notable people
Amos E. Germer, lawyer and politician, lived in Dexterville.

Notes

External links
 1909 plat map of Dexterville
 1928 plat map

Unincorporated communities in Wisconsin
Unincorporated communities in Wood County, Wisconsin